Éder Antônio Souza (born 15 October 1986) is a Brazilian hurdler. He competed in the 110 metres hurdles at the 2007 and 2015 World Championships without qualifying for the semifinals. His personal bests are 13.46 seconds in the 110 metres hurdles (+1.4 m/s, São Bernardo do Campo 2015) and 7.72 seconds in the 60 meters hurdles (Valladolid 2008).

Competition record

1Disqualified in the semifinals

References

External links

1986 births
Living people
Brazilian male hurdlers
World Athletics Championships athletes for Brazil
Athletes (track and field) at the 2007 Pan American Games
Athletes (track and field) at the 2015 Pan American Games
Place of birth missing (living people)
Pan American Games athletes for Brazil
Athletes (track and field) at the 2016 Summer Olympics
Olympic athletes of Brazil
Athletes (track and field) at the 2018 South American Games
South American Games silver medalists for Brazil
South American Games medalists in athletics
20th-century Brazilian people
21st-century Brazilian people